Frank William Bosch (born October 24, 1945) is a former American football defensive lineman in the National Football League for the Washington Redskins.  He played college football at the University of Colorado and was drafted in the 17th round of the 1968 NFL Draft.

1945 births
Living people
American football defensive linemen
Washington Redskins players
Colorado Buffaloes football players